Highness Samson Kiwia (born 8 October 1976) was a Tanzanian CHADEMA politician and Member of Parliament for Ilemela constituency between 2010 and 2015.

References

1976 births
Living people
Chadema MPs
Tanzanian MPs 2010–2015
Lake Secondary School alumni